Lawrence Cherono (born August 7, 1988) is a Kenyan long-distance runner. He is currently the 8th fastest marathon performer of all time with his 2:03:04 clocking at the 2020 Valencia Marathon. He clocked 2:04:06 to win the Amsterdam Marathon on October 21, 2018.  He also won the Amsterdam Marathon in 2017, running a time of 2:05:09, setting the course record, which he broke in 2018. 

On 15 April 2019, Cherono won the Boston Marathon with a time of 2:07:57.  He out-sprinted two-time Boston winner and World Championship Silver medalist Lelisa Desisa on the final block of Boylston Street.

On 13 October 2019, Cherono won the 2019 Chicago Marathon with a time of 2:05:45. He out-kicked three other runners in the final 200 meters to win the race. 

In 2020 Cherono raced the Valencia Marathon, where he placed 2nd in a new personal best time of 2:03:04. 

On July 16, 2022, Cherono tested positive for trimetazidine and was suspended just one day before slated to run the marathon at the 2022 World Athletics Championships.

2020 Tokyo Olympic Games 
He qualified to represent Kenya at the 2020 Summer Olympics. 

At the 2020 Tokyo Olympic Games men's marathon Cherono placed 4th getting out sprinted by Abdi Nageeye and Bashir Abdi, while Eliud Kipchoge won.

International competitions

World Marathon Majors Record

References

External links

Living people
1988 births
Kalenjin people
Kenyan male long-distance runners
Kenyan male marathon runners
Boston Marathon male winners
Chicago Marathon male winners
People from Uasin Gishu County
Athletes (track and field) at the 2020 Summer Olympics
Olympic athletes of Kenya